Gharib Mahalleh may refer to:
 Gharib Mahalleh, Gilan
 Gharib Mahalleh, Mazandaran